Daddry Shield is a village in County Durham, England. It is situated on the south side of the River Wear in Weardale, a short distance from St John's Chapel. In the 2001 census Daddry Shield had a population of 177.

References

Villages in County Durham
Stanhope, County Durham